Gennadi Vladimirovich Soshenko (born 15 November 1958) is a Russian professional football coach and a former player. Currently, he is an assistant coach with FC Fakel Voronezh.

Career
Soshenko played youth football with local side FC Salyut Belgorod. After he entered military service, Soshenko was assigned to play for Soviet First League side FC Dynamo Stavropol. After three years in Stavropol, he returned to Salyut Belgorod where he scored ten league goals during the 1983 season. Soshenko earned a move to FC Fakel Voronezh where he enjoyed his greatest footballing successes.

Honours
 Latvian Higher League champion: 1992, 1993.

References

External links
  Career summary at KLISF

1958 births
Living people
Soviet footballers
Russian footballers
Russian expatriate footballers
Expatriate footballers in Latvia
FC Dynamo Stavropol players
FC Salyut Belgorod players
FC Fakel Voronezh players
Skonto FC players
Russian football managers
FC Metallurg Lipetsk managers
Russian expatriate sportspeople in Latvia
Association football midfielders
FC Tekstilshchik Kamyshin players